The Malay world or Malay realm (Indonesian/Malay:  or ;), is a concept or an expression that has been used by different authors and groups over time to denote several different notions, derived from varied interpretations of Malayness, either as a racial category, as a linguistic group or as a cultural group. The use of the term 'Malay' in much of the conceptualisation is largely based on the prevalent Malay cultural influence, manifested in particular through the spread of the Malay language in Southeast Asia as observed by different colonial powers during the Age of Discovery and spread of Islam. The term remains highly controversial outside of Malay-speaking areas and as such is considered politically charged and irredentist rather than purely cultural.

The concept in its broadest territorial stretch may apply to a region synonymous with Austronesia, homeland to the Austronesian peoples, that extends from Easter Island in the east to Madagascar in the west. Such description has its origin in the introduction of the term Malay race in the late 18th century that has been popularised by orientalists to describe the Austronesian peoples. In a narrower sense, the Malay world has been used as a synonym for Malay sprachraum, referring to the Malay-speaking countries and territories of Southeast Asia, where different standards of Malay are the national languages or a variety of it is an important minority language. The term in this sense encompasses Brunei, Indonesia, Malaysia, Singapore and Southern Thailand, and is sometimes used interchangeably with the concepts of 'Malay Archipelago' and 'Nusantara'.
Malayophones (peoples and nations that speak Malay/Indonesian as their native language or recognize it as an official language) number an estimated 330 million people (projected 2025), comprising just under half of the population of Southeast Asia in eight sovereign states and territories: Indonesia, Malaysia, Singapore and Brunei, where Malay is an official language under the name 'Malay', 'Indonesian' or 'Malaysian'; East Timor and parts of Thailand and the Philippines, where Malay/Indonesian is recognized as a minority or trade language, and the Australian territories of the Cocos (Keeling) Islands and Christmas Island, where Malay is the majority language and a significant minority, respectively.

Alternatively, modern scholars correct these extended notions of the Malay world, defining it as a political and cultural area instead. In this context, the Malay world is reduced to a region that is homeland to the Malays (ethnic group), historically ruled by different sultanates power, where various Malayic languages and cultural values are predominant. This area includes the coastal areas of Sumatra, Malay Peninsula, Borneo and the smaller islands in between.

The most notable use of the concept was in the early 20th century, embraced in an irredentist fashion, by Malay nationalists in the form of 'Greater Indonesia' or 'Greater Malay' (Indonesia Raya/Melayu Raya), as an aspiration for the natural or desired borders of a modern nation for the Malay race. Classical Malay literatures such as Sejarah Melayu and Hikayat Hang Tuah do not mention the term "Alam Melayu" (Malay world). The term only developed after 1930, with the first recorded examples coming from Majalah Guru, a Malay states monthly magazine, and the newspaper Saudara, which was published in Penang and circulated throughout the Straits Settlements. The term "Alam Melayu" developed and became popular after the emergence of the Malay nationalism movement in the second quarter of the 20th century.

Malay world culture has also had an impact on cultures outside of the traditional Malay world most notably in Sri Lanka and Thailand. In Sri Lanka, Indonesian-Javanese cultural influences have had a deep impact on many aspects of modern Sri Lankan culture. Javanese culture has deeply influenced Sri Lankan cuisine with many dishes like sambal, dodol and nasi kuning (kaha buth)  having their origins in the Malay archipelago (especially Java). The Sri Lankan sarong, the raban, the practice of making batik as well as the traditional use of the outrigger canoe among other things were introduced to Sri Lanka through Indonesian contact. In Thailand, some of the national cuisine has absorbed Malay and Indonesian influences with Javanese-origin dishes like satay being ubiquitous in the country.

Historical origin

Early conception

Territorial identification of Malay is of ancient origin. Various foreign and local records show that Melayu (Malay) and its similar sounding variants appear to apply as an old toponym to the ancient Sumatra region in general. In the 7th century, the term gradually developed into an ethnonym throughout the consolidation of Srivijaya as a regional power. Tomé Pires, an apothecary who stayed in Melaka from 1512 to 1515, after the Portuguese conquest, explained how the former Malacca classified merchants calling its port into four groups, of which the Malays or Melayu did not appear in the list, suggesting they were not then regarded as category outside the Melaka itself.

Another term, Malayos or the 'Sea of Malayu' was espoused by the Portuguese historian, Manuel Godinho de Erédia to describe areas under Malaccan dominance. The area covers the Andaman Sea in the north, the entire Strait of Malacca in the centre, a part of Sunda Strait in the south and the western South China Sea in the east. It was generally described as a Muslim centre of international trade, with Malay language as its lingua franca. Erédia's description indicates that Malayos was a geo-religio-sociocultural concept, a concept of geographical unity characterised by the common religious belief and cultural features.

An identical term, Tanah Melayu (literally 'Malay land') is found in various Malay texts, of which the oldest are dating back to the early 17th century. It is frequently mentioned in the Hikayat Hang Tuah, a well known classical work that began as oral tales associated with the legendary heroes of Melaka Sultanate. Tanah Melayu in the text is consistently employed to refer to the area under Melakan dominance. In the early 16th century, Tomé Pires coins an almost similar term, Terra de Tana Malaio for the southeastern part of Sumatra, where the deposed Sultan of Melaka, Mahmud Shah established his exiled government.

The application of Tanah Melayu to the Malay Peninsula entered into the European authorship, when Marsden and Crawfurd noted it in their historical works published in 1811 and 1820 respectively. Another important term, the Malaya, an English term for the Peninsula, was already used in English writings from the early 18th century.

Due to the lack of available research, it is difficult to trace the development of the concept of the Malay world as a term which later refers to the archipelago. However, thus classical territorial identifications are believed to have formed an important antecedent for the future conceptualisation of the Malay world. The term "Alam Melayu" itself did not exist before the 20th century. Classical Malay literatures between the 14th century to the 20th century never mentioned "Alam Melayu" or any similar term. Instead, the term emerged along with the emergence of the Malay identity and nationality movement after 1930, mentioned in Malay periodicals such as Majalah Guru magazine, Saudara newspaper, Majlis newspaper, and Puisi-Puisi Kebangsaan newspaper.

Malay as a racial category

The broader concept of Malay world has its origin from the conceptualisation of Malay as a race by the German scientist Johann Friedrich Blumenbach. Blumenbach identified 'Malay' as a subcategory of both the Ethiopid and Mongoloid races, and expanded the term to include the native inhabitants of the Mariana Islands, the Philippines, the Maluku Islands, Sunda Islands, Indochina, as well as Pacific Islands like the Tahitians. This broad conception of Malay was largely derived from the strong presence of Malay cultural influence, particularly in linguistic, throughout Southeast Asia at the time of European colonisation. The Malay language was one aspect of the prestige of the sultanates in the region, and considered as a language of the educated people in Southeast Asia during the 17th and 18th century. An 18th century European account even suggests that one is not considered a very broadly educated man in the east, if he don't understand Malay.

The popularisation of Malay as a racial category was in essence a colonial product, the significant role of which played by the Spanish since the 17th century and that of the British since the 18th century in identifying the Archipelago as the Malay world. The view held by Thomas Stamford Raffles for example, had a significant influence on English-speakers, lasting to the present day. He should probably be regarded as the most important voice in projecting the idea of a 'Malay' race or nation, not limited to the traditional Raja-Raja Melayu or even their supporters, but embracing a large if unspecified part of the Archipelago. William Marsden, another British "merchant-scientist", classified the inhabitants of the Archipelago as Malays, based on religion (Islam), language (Malay) and origin.

Malay territoriality in three tiers
In the late 19th century, an important innovation was introduced into the political vocabulary of the Malay language. The word kerajaan, which had in older times usually meant "king", "royalty" and "kingdom", began to be defined as "government". In the same period, the term negeri was increasingly being used as a word equivalent to "state", in contrast to its earlier use in court texts more in the sense of a 'settlement' than of a political entity. With growing frequency, publications of the 1870s and 1880s employed the term to refer either to individual Malay sultanates or any political state in the world beyond the Malay territories.

British historian, Wilkinson, prefers the term "state" to refer to an administrative or territorial unit in the Malay Peninsula in his time, while he uses the word "kingdom" or "sultanate" for a Malay polity of older times. While Wilkinson often uses "the Peninsula" or "the Malay Peninsula", he also calls the Peninsula "Malaya." His use of the word "Malaya" occasionally includes not merely the Peninsula under British rule but also its other parts under Siamese rule. In referring to the Archipelago, Wilkinson not only uses "the Archipelago" or "the Indian Archipelago", but also "the Malay world", which might have more sociocultural connotations.

Among the textbooks available during colonial Malaya, Winstedt's Ilmu Alam Melayu ('Geography of the Malay world') presents the clearest picture of the territoriality of the Malay community. As expressed in the title, Winstedt attempts to cover most of the Archipelago. He describes not only the British colonies and protectorates in the Malay Peninsula and Borneo, but also the Netherlands East Indies and the Philippines. The structure of Ilmu Alam Melayu shows the three-tiered constitution of the Malay world. The Malay world (Alam Melayu) is divided into sub-regions, namely, Malaya (Tanah Melayu), the British Borneo territories, the Netherlands East Indies and the Philippines. Malaya, in turn, is made up of the Malay states (Negeri-Negeri Melayu). It is also important to note the standardization of geographical knowledge in this geography textbook. All states in the Peninsula, the main islands and areas of the Netherlands East Indies and all of the Philippines are systematically discussed through the common topics of overview, districts and towns, products, inhabitants and history. Such a systematic and comprehensive catalogue of geographical knowledge helps to convey an image of the Malay world as a territorial entity.

Malay historian Abdul Hadi Haji Hassan, who cites Winstedt's textbooks in his Sejarah 'Alam Melayu ('History of the Malay world'), had much in common with Winstedt's view of the Malay world. According to him, the Malay territories are made up of the Malay states, Malaya and the Malay world in general. Of the 12 chapters in the three volumes of Abdul Hadi's textbook, four chapters focus on the history of the Malays in Malaya, while other chapters deal with the history of the Malays in the Malay world generally. It ought to be added that the history of each colony or state (negeri) in the Straits Settlements and the Federated Malay States is explained in the fourth and the fifth volumes of the book written by another Malay historian, Buyong Adil in 1934 and 1940. Thus, both British and Malay authors conceptualised Malay territoriality in three tiers, that is, the Malay states, Malaya and the Malay world.

Malay nationalism

The standardisation of geographical knowledge and systematic quantification, served to objectify the territoriality of the Malay community. Early authors in Malaya also developed a Malaya-centric view on the subject, proclaiming Malaya or Tanah Melayu as the focal point of the Malay territories. This view reflected the substantialisation of the colonial territorial boundary and provided new objectification of space seems to have played an important role in conceiving a potential national territory. It is probable that these three territorial identities, namely, Malay states, Malaya and the Malay world had much to do with the strands of Malay nationalism.

On the one hand, in the late 1930s, Malay aristocrats and their supporters began to organize Malay state associations. For them, Malay states were the focus of territorial identity. In postwar Malaya, these state-based Malay associations were dissolved into a Malaya-based Malay political party, that is, the United Malays National Organisation. Their territorial identity was gradually shifted from Malay states to Malaya or Tanah Melayu. On the other hand, in the late 1930s, some Malay non-aristocrat intellectuals formed a pan-Malay-oriented association, that is, Kesatuan Melayu Muda or Young Malay Union. As shown by its President, Ibrahim Hj Yaacob, the territorial stretch of their imagined homeland covered the Malay world or the Malay Archipelago as a whole.

Modern conception
Although the extended notions of Malay world still gained widespread currency, such conceptualisation is sometimes described in other terms, perceived as more 'neutral', like Nusantara, Indonesian archipelago, and Maritime Southeast Asia. New approaches have also been taken by modern authors to redefine the 'Malay world', by taking into account the historic political pattern of the region, in addition to the existing racial-linguistic spread model.

In this context, modern authors in Malay studies like Anthony Milner, Geoffrey Benjamin, and Vivienne Wee provide a narrower definition, reducing the concept into a political and cultural area. Benjamin for example, describes the concept in an historically responsive manner to refer to the areas currently or formerly falling under Kerajaan Melayu ('Malay kingdoms'), the rule of a Malay king. It does not refer to Insular Southeast Asia at large, and certainly not the Austronesian-speaking world as a whole, both of which are usages of Malay world that have crept into scholarly discourse. In this sense, the Malay world refers to various kingdoms and their attendant hinterlands that have existed or still exist along the coasts of Brunei, the east coast of Sumatra and on the Malay peninsula.

This limited conceptualisation of Malay world was also espoused by Wee. She added further, that the concept is a spatial configuration that resulted from the serial patterning of political alliances, unified by Sejarah Melayu, that is a particular genealogical tree of kingship. The other, non-Malay areas would be those where the rulers did not claim to belong to this particular genealogical tree. For example, Aceh is located on the northern tip of the Sumatran mainland, yet the rulers evidently did not claim to belong to the Malay genealogical tree. And indeed Aceh is generally not regarded as part of Alam Melayu. On the contrary, both the indigenous and foreign texts indicate that Aceh, similar to Java, was an historical enemy of Alam Melayu. Hence to locate oneself within Alam Melayu is to claim membership in a specific network of political alliances.

See also

Malayness

Malayisation
Malay Archipelago
Indonesian Archipelago
East Indies
Dutch East Indies
Spanish East Indies
East Indies Company
Malay race
Greater Indonesia
Maphilindo

References

Bibliography

External links 
 Malay Concordance Project, contains resources for Malay literatures, especially classical Malay literatures

Cultural regions
Regions of Eurasia
Malay culture
Malay people